Thelma Smith was an American film editor active in Hollywood in the 1920s who worked with filmmaker J.P. McGowan at Morris R. Schlank Productions.

Biography 
Smith was working as a film editor in Hollywood by 1922; the first film we for sure know she worked on was 1924's A Woman Who Sinned. She didn't officially receive credits until a few years later, when she became a cutter for director J.P. McGowan.

Selected filmography 

 Crossed Signals (1926)
 Ace of Clubs (1925)
 Red Blood (1925)
 Riding for Life (1925)
 The Road Agent (1925)
 A Woman Who Sinned (1924)

References 

American film editors
American women film editors